Lloyd Neal (born December 10, 1950) is an American former professional basketball player born in Talbotton, Georgia.

A 6'7" center/forward from Tennessee State University, Neal spent his entire professional career (1972–1979) with the National Basketball Association's Portland Trail Blazers.  Though undersized for his position, he endeared himself to fans with his hard work and tenacity, and he averaged a double-double (13.4 points, 11.8 rebounds) during the 1972–73 NBA season.  After his career was cut short by a knee injury in 1979, the Blazers retired his #36 jersey.  He finished college in 1980 and moved on to a long career with the Internal Revenue Service in Portland, where he's worked since 1985.

References

External links
Career stats at www.basketball-reference.com 
Profile at www.nba.com/blazers

1950 births
Living people
African-American basketball players
American men's basketball players
Basketball players from Georgia (U.S. state)
Centers (basketball)
National Basketball Association players with retired numbers
People from Talbotton, Georgia
Portland Trail Blazers draft picks
Portland Trail Blazers players
Power forwards (basketball)
Tennessee State Tigers basketball players
21st-century African-American people
20th-century African-American sportspeople